Allstars is the only album released by British pop group Allstars. It was released on 13 May 2002 and peaked at number 43, spending only two weeks in the UK Album Charts. After that, the band parted ways with their record company, Island, and split up soon after, in June 2002. The album was re-released with a bonus remix CD. This deluxe version peaked at number 84.

Track listing

Charts

References

2002 debut albums